Shahrak-e Siah Cheshmeh va Menatul (also Romanized as Shahrak-e Sīāh Cheshmeh va Menāṭūl; also known as Sīāh Cheshmeh and Sīāh Chashmeh) is a village in Sharifabad Rural District, Sharifabad District, Pakdasht County, Tehran Province, Iran. At the 2006 census, its population was 303, in 74 families.

References 

Populated places in Pakdasht County